Turkey competed at the 2020 Summer Paralympics in Tokyo, Japan from 24 August to 5 September 2021. This was the country's seventh appearance in the past eight Games despite their absence in the 1996 Summer Paralympics.

Medalists

| width=75% align=left valign=top |

| width=25% align=left valign=top |

Competitors
Source:

Archery

Turkey have secured eleven quotas in archery.

|-
|align=left| Nihat Türkmenoğlu
|align=left rowspan=2|Men's individual W1
|661
|1
|colspan=2 
|W 133–129
|W 139–132
|L 141–142
|
|-
|align=left|Bahattin Hekimoğlu
|643
|5
|
|W 135–107
|W 138–135
|L 132–139
|W 139–134
|
|-
|align=left|Bülent Korkmaz
|align=left rowspan=2|Men's individual compound open
|689
|10
|W 141–137
|L 145–146
|align=center colspan=4| did not advance
|-
|align=left|Murat Turan
|675
|24
|W 139–139
|W 142–138
|L 145–148
|align=center colspan=3| did not advance
|-
|align=left|Sadık Savaş
|align=left rowspan=2|Men's individual recurve open
|611
|9
|W 6–4
|W 6–4
|L 2–6
|align=center colspan=3| did not advance
|-
|align=left|Vedat Aksoy
|583
|25
|W 6–2
|L 4–6
|align=center colspan=4| did not advance
|-
|align=left|Fatma Danabaş
|align=left|Women's individual W1
|515
|12
|
|L 115–126
|align=center colspan=4| did not advance
|-
|align=left|Öznur Cüre
|align=left rowspan=2|Women's individual compound open
|689
|3
|
|L 140–143
|align=center colspan=4| did not advance
|-
|align=left|Sevgi Yorulmaz
|679
|10
|W 133-133
|W 140-136
|L 129-139
|align=center colspan=3| did not advance
|-
|align=left|Yağmur Şengül
|align=left rowspan=2|Women's individual recurve open
|557
|15
|L 4–6
|align=center colspan=5| did not advance
|-
|align=left|Zehra Özbey Torun
|554
|18
|W 6–4
|L 0–6
|align=center colspan=4| did not advance
|-
|align=left|Nihat TürkmenoğluFatma Danabaş
|align=left|Mixed team W1
|colspan=4 
|L 114–133
|align=center colspan=3| did not advance
|- align=center
|align=left|Bülent KorkmazÖznur Cüre
|align=left|Mixed team compound
|colspan=4 
|W 153–151
|W 156–155
|L 152–153
|
|- align=center
|align=left|Yağmur ŞengülSadık Savaş
|align=left|Mixed team recurve
|colspan=3 
|L 1–5
|align=center colspan=4| did not advance
|}

Athletics

9 athlete in 13 events are representing Turkey at the 2020 Summer Paralympics.

Track events

Field events

Badminton 

Women

Goalball

Men

Group stage

Quarterfinal

Women

Group stage

Quarterfinal

Semifinal

Final

Judo

Powerlifting

Shooting 

9 Turkish shooters qualified in 19 events.

Swimming 

5 swimmer will represent Turkey in 18 events in swimming at the 2020 Summer Paralympics via the 2019 World Para Swimming Championships slot allocation method & MQS.

Table tennis

Turkey entered nine athletes into the table tennis competition at the games. Abdullah Ozturk qualified from 2019 ITTF European Para Championships which was held in Helsingborg, Sweden and five others from World Ranking allocation.

Men

Women

Taekwondo

Para taekwondo makes its debut appearance in the Paralympic programme, six Turkish taekwondo practitioners qualified to the 2020 Summer Paralympics via World Ranking.

Wheelchair basketball 

The men's team qualified after entered top four at the 2019 IWBF Men's European Championship held in Wałbrzych, Poland.

Team roster

Group A

Wheelchair fencing

Wheelchair tennis

Busra Un qualified by world ranking.

See also
Turkey at the Paralympics
Turkey at the 2020 Summer Olympics

References

Nations at the 2020 Summer Paralympics
2020
2021 in Turkish sport